This article refers to the sports broadcasting contracts in Denmark. For a list of other countries' broadcasting rights, see Sports television broadcast contracts.

American Football 
National Football League (NFL)
 Viasat (TV3+, TV3 Sport 1, Viaplay)
 TV 2 Denmark (TV 2 SPORT, TV 2 PLAY)
Super Bowl
 Viasat (TV3+, TV3 Sport 1, TV3 Sport 2, Viaplay)
 TV 2 Denmark (TV 2)

Association Football 
Premier League (through 2022)
TDC A/S (Xee)
Viasat (TV3+, TV3 Sport 1, TV3 Sport 2, Viaplay)
Eredivisie
 TV2 Denmark (TV2 Sport)
Danish Superliga
 Viasat (TV3+, TV3 Sport 1, TV3 Sport 2, Viaplay)
 Discovery (Eurosport 2, Canal 9)
Danish 1st Division
 Viasat (TV3 Sport 1, Viaplay)
Eliteserien
Discovery (Eurosport, Kanal 5, Canal 9)
La Liga
TV2 Denmark (TV2 Sport)
Serie A (through 2021)
TV2 Denmark (TV2 Sport)
Ligue 1
 Viasat (TV3 Sport 1, TV3 Sport 2, Viaplay)
Liga NOS (Portuguese league)
Viasat (TV3 Sport 2)
DBU Pokalen
Danmark Radio (DR1, DR3)
Viasat (TV3+, TV3 Sport 1)
EFL Cup
Discovery (6'eren, Eurosport 2)
The Emirates FA Cup (through 2021)
Viasat (TV3+, TV3 Sport 1, TV3 Sport 2, Viaplay)
Discovery (6'eren, Eurosport 2, Canal 9, DPlay)
RFEF (through 2022)
Copa del Rey: Ekstra Bladet
Supercopa: Discovery (6'eren, Dplay).
Coppa Italia (through 2021)
Viasat (TV3+, TV3 Sport 1, TV3 Sport 2, Viaplay) (2018-19 only)
TV2 Denmark (TV2 Sport) (from 2019-20)
The Mc'Donalds FA Community Shield (through 2020)
Viasat (TV3+, TV3 Sport 1, TV3 Sport 2, Viaplay)
Major League Soccer (through 2022)
TV2 Denmark (TV2 Sport)
K-League (Korean League)
YouTube (COPA90)
FIFA Club World Cup (2019 and 2020)
Ekstra Bladet
UEFA Champions League
Viasat (TV3+, TV3 Sport 1, TV3 Sport 2, Viasat XTRA, Viaplay)
UEFA Europa League
Discovery (Eurosport 2, Canal 9, 6'eren, Dplay)
UEFA Super Cup
Viasat (TV3+, TV3 Sport, Viasat XTRA, Viaplay)
UEFA Youth League
Viasat (TV3+, TV3 Sport 1, TV3 Sport 2, Viasat XTRA, Viaplay)
UEFA Women's Champions League
DAZN
CONMEBOL Libertadores
Discovery. Final only on 6'eren and Eurosport.
Denmark national football team
Discovery (Kanal 5). under-21 team (exclude at the finals tournament)
TV2 Denmark (TV2 Sport, TV2). Men's (2022 until 2028) (include at the finals tournament)
Danmarks Radio (DR1, DR3). For women's team
FIFA World Cup
Danmark Radio (DR1, DR3). Finals tournament.
TV2 Denmark (TV2 Sport, TV2). finals and UEFA qualifiers.
TBA. CONMEBOL qualifiers.
TBA. CONCACAF qualifiers.
FIFA U-20 World Cup
Eurovision
FIFA U-17 World Cup
Eurovision
FIFA Beach Soccer World Cup
Eurovision
FIFA Women's World Cup
Danmark Radio (DR1, DR3), Group-stage, knock-out games, semifinals, finals
Eurovision
FIFA U-20 Women's World Cup
Eurovision
FIFA U-17 Women's World Cup
Eurovision
UEFA European Championship
Danmark Radio. Finals tournament. 22 matches (including two until six Denmark matches (confirmed for two group stage matches) and also a final) in 2020.
Viasat. Finals tournament. All matches (including a final match) live streamed on Viaplay with 29 matches (including one until four Denmark team matches (confirmed for one group stage match) and excluding a final match) live on TV3 in 2020.
Discovery (Kanal 5). Qualifiers Matches until 2020
TV2 Denmark (TV2 Sport, TV2). Qualifiers (2022 until 2027 or 2028) and finals tournament (exclude 2020).
UEFA Nations League
TV2 Denmark (TV2 Sport, TV2) (2022 until 2027).
UEFA European Under-21 Championship
Danmark Radio
UEFA European Under-19 Championship
Danmark Radio
YouTube
UEFA European Under-17 Championship
Danmark Radio
TV2 Denmark
YouTube
UEFA Women's Championship
Danmark Radio
UEFA Women's Under-19 Championship
Danmark Radio
YouTube
UEFA Women's Under-17 Championship
Danmark Radio
TV2 Denmark
YouTube

Copa América
Viasat (TV3+, TV3 Sport 1, Viaplay)

 CONCACAF Gold Cup
 Concacaf GO

Handball 

Danish Handball League (men)
 TV2 Denmark (TV2 Sport, TV2)
Danish Handball League(Women)
 TV2 Denmark (TV2 Sport, TV2)
EHF Champions League (men)
 Danmark Radio
 Viasat (TV3 Sport, TV3 Max)
EHF Champions League (Women)
 Danmark Radio
 Viasat (TV3 Sport, TV3 Max)
LNH Division 1 (France handball league)
 Viasat (TV3 Sport 1, TV3 Sport 2)
Liga ASOBAL (Spain handball league)
 Viasat (TV3 Sport 1, TV3 Sport 2)
European Men's Handball Championship
 Danmark Radio. Denmark matches, semifinals, finals
 TV2 Denmark. Denmark matches, semifinals, finals
European Women's Handball Championship
 TV2 Denmark. Denmark matches, semifinals, finals
World Men's Handball Championship
 Danmark Radio. Denmark matches, semifinals, finals
 Viasat (TV3 Sport 1, TV3 Sport 2, Viaplay). Other matches
World Women's Handball Championship
 Danmark Radio. Denmark matches, semifinals, finals
 Viasat (TV3 Sport 1, TV3 Sport 2, Viaplay). Other matches

Ice hockey 

National Hockey League
 Viasat (TV3 Sport 1, TV3 Sport 2, Viaplay)
2016 World Cup of Hockey
 Viasat (TV3 Sport 1, TV3 Sport 2, Viaplay)
Metal Ligaen (Danish ice league)
 TV2 Denmark (TV2 Sport)
Denmark men's national ice hockey team
 TV2 Denmark (TV2 Sport)
AL-Bank Cup (Danish cup turnement)
 TV2 Denmark (TV2 Sport)
Swedish Hockey League
 Discovery (Eurosport 2, Dplay)
Champions Hockey League
 Discovery (Eurosport 2, Dplay)

Cycling 
Tour de France
 TV2 Denmark (All stages)
 Discovery (Eurosport, Eurosport Player) (All Stages)
Giro d'Italia
 TV2 Denmark (All stages)
 Discovery (Eurosport, Eurosport Player) (All Stages)
Vuelta a España
 TV2 Denmark (All stages)
 Discovery (Eurosport, Eurosport Player) (All Stages)
Post Danmark Rundt
 Danmark Radio
UCI Road World Championships
 Viasat (TV3 Sport 1, Viaplay)
Some spring classics
 TV2 Denmark 
 Eurosport, Eurosport 2, Eurosport Player

Tennis 

ATP Tour
 Discovery (Eurosport Danmark, Eurosport Player)
WTA Tour
 Discovery (Eurosport Danmark, Eurosport Player)
 Viasat (TV3+, TV3 Sport 1, TV3 Sport 2, Viaplay)
Davis Cup
 Canal 8 Sport, Canal 9
Wimbledon
 Viasat (TV3+, TV3 Sport 1, TV3 Sport 2)
Australian Open
 Discovery (Eurosport Danmark, Eurosport Player)
US Open
 Discovery (Eurosport Danmark, Eurosport Player)
French Open
 Discovery (Eurosport Danmark, Eurosport Player)

Baseball 

Major League Baseball
 Discovery (6'eren, Eurosport Danmark, Eurosport Player)

Basketball 

National Basketball Association
 TV2 Denmark (TV2 Sport)
Basketball ligaen (Danish league)
 TV2 Denmark (TV2 Sport)

Badminton 

Danish Badminton League
 Viasat (TV3 Sport 1, TV3 Sport 2, Viaplay)
Yonex DM (Danish tournament)
 Viasat (TV3 Sport 1, TV3 Sport 2, Viaplay)
BWF
TV2 Denmark (TV2 Sport)
Yonex Copenhagen Masters (Danish tournament)
 Viasat (TV3 Sport 1, TV3 Sport 2, Viaplay)

Motorsports 

Speedway Grand Prix
 Viasat (TV3+, TV3 Sport 1, TV3 Sport 2, Viaplay)
Speedway World Cup
 Viasat (TV3+, TV3 Sport 1, TV3 Sport 2, Viaplay)
Elitserien
 Discovery (Eurosport Danmark, Eurosport Player)
IndyCar Series
 Discovery (Eurosport Danmark, Eurosport Player)
NASCAR
 Discovery (Eurosport Danmark, Eurosport Player)
Formel 1
 Viasat (TV3+, TV3 Sport 1, TV3 Sport 2, Viasat XTRA, Viaplay)
Scandinavian Touring Car Championship
 C-More (Canal 8 Sport, Canal 9, C More Play)
24 Hours of Le Mans
 TV2 Denmark
 Discovery (Eurosport, Eurosport Player)
World Rally Championship
 Viasat (TV3+, TV3 Sport 1, TV3 Sport 2, Viaplay)
Moto GP
 Viasat (TV3 Sport 2, Viasat XTRA, Viaplay)
Deutsche Tourenwagen Masters (DTM)
 Viasat (TV3+, TV3 Sport 1, TV3 Sport 2, Viaplay)

Fight Sports 
Bellator MMA
Discovery (Eurosport Danmark, Eurosport Player)
Bushido MMA
DAZN: October 2022 to October 2025, all fights
CAGE MMA Finland
 Viaplay
 Cage Warriors
 Viasat (TV3+, TV3 Sport 1, TV3 Sport 2, Viaplay)
Dream Boxing
DAZN: October 2022 to October 2025, all fights
Golden Boy Promotions
DAZN
King of Kings
DAZN: October 2022 to October 2025, all fights
Matchroom Boxing
DAZN
ONE Championship
FITE TV
Rumble Of The Kings
Discovery (Eurosport Danmark, Eurosport Player)
Nordic Fight Night
Viasat (TV3+, TV3 Sport 1, TV3 Sport 2, Viaplay)
Some Boxing Events
Viasat (TV3+, TV3 Sport 1, TV3 Sport 2, Viaplay)
Discovery (Eurosport Danmark, Eurosport Player)
UFC
 Discovery (Eurosport Danmark, Eurosport Player)
World Extreme Cagefighting
 Discovery (Eurosport Danmark, Eurosport Player)
WWE
Discovery (Eurosport Danmark, Eurosport Player)

Golf 

Ryder Cup
 Viasat Golf, Viaplay
PGA Tour
 Viasat Golf, Viaplay
European Tour
 Viasat Golf, Viaplay
British Open
 Viasat Golf, Viaplay
PGA Championship
 Viasat Golf, Viaplay
World Golf Championships
 Viasat Golf, Viaplay
US Masters
 Viasat (TV3 Sport 1, TV3 Sport 2, Viaplay)

Athletics 

Diamond League
 Viasat (TV3 Sport 1, TV3 Sport 2, Viaplay)

Volleyball 

European Championship (men)
 Viasat (TV3 Sport 1, TV3 Sport 2, Viaplay)
FIVB WorldTour
 Viasat (TV3 Sport 1, TV3 Sport 2, Viaplay)

Ski sports 

Swix Ski Classics
 Viasat (TV3 Sport 1, TV3 Sport 2, Viaplay)
X Games
 Danmarks Radio (DR3)
 FIS Alpine World Ski Championships Åre 2019

References

Denmark
Television in Denmark